Ver van die Ou Kalahari is the first full-length album by South African artist Koos Kombuis. It was released in 1987 by Shifty Records.

Track listing

External links 
 Official Koos Kombuis website

1987 debut albums
Koos Kombuis albums